Claudia Jameson was a writer of romance novels from 1981 to 1991.

Bibliography

Single novels 
 Escape to Love (1981)
 Lesson in Love (1982)
 The Melting Heart (1983)
 Never Say Never (1983)
 Yours Faithfully (1983)
 For Practical Reasons (1983)
 Gentle Persuasion (1983)
 Dawn of a New Day (1984)
 The Frenchman's Kiss (1984)
 A Time to Grow (1984)
 The Scorpio Man (1985)
 Roses, Always Roses (1985)
 Man in Room 12 (1985)
 One Dream Only (1985)
 To Speak of Love (1986)
 Adam's Law (1986)
 Immune to Love (1986)
 An Engagement Is Announced (1987)
 A Man of Contrasts (1987)
 Playing Safe (1988)
 Unconditional Love (1988)
 That Certain Yearning (1989)
 A Second Loving (1990)
 An Answer from the Heart (1990)
 A Love That Endures (1991)
 A Second Chance (1991)

References 
 Harlequin Enterprises Ltd

External links 
 Claudia Jameson's Webpage in Fantastic Fiction's Website

English romantic fiction writers
Women romantic fiction writers
English women novelists
Living people
Year of birth missing (living people)